The New Road was a toll road built across fields around the northern boundaries of London, the first part of which opened in 1756. The route comprises the modern-day A501 (Old Marylebone Road, Marylebone Road, Euston Road, Pentonville Road, City Road, and Moorgate).

Background
In the 18th century London began to grow rapidly. Until 1750 there was only one road crossing over the River Thames, namely London Bridge. But the capital started to sprawl, first along the river from the City to Westminster, and then north past Soho (in medieval times, the king's hunting grounds) to Oxford Street and beyond.

The Proceedings of the Old Bailey Online Project give a good overview of the demographic growth of the capital. From the early 19th century, London was the largest city in the world.

Early history
In 1755 influential residents of St Marylebone, Paddington and Islington, all separate villages close to London, petitioned Parliament for the right to provide a turnpike trust road by-passing the northern boundaries of the built up area of London. The road was intended initially as a drovers' road, a route along which to drive cattle and sheep, to the live meat market at Smithfield from roads approaching London from the north and north-west, thus avoiding the congested east–west route via Oxford Street and High Holborn.

The road would begin at a point close to the junction of the Harrow and Edgware Roads and head due east past the northern end of Marylebone Lane to Tottenham Court, and from there via Battle Bridge, St Pancras, to the top of St John's Street in Islington, a short distance from the market. The proposal was referred to a parliamentary committee, which, despite opposition from the Duke of Bedford, recommended approval; it suggested that responsibility for the road should be divided between two existing trusts, the St Marylebone (for the section from Edgware Road to Tottenham Court, plus a side street that became Portland Road) and the Islington (for the section from Tottenham Court to the Angel, Islington).

Royal assent for the Act was granted in May 1756. Construction at first was fairly crude, involving mainly cutting down hedges and filling in ditches, and the route was bounded by fence posts.

Initially, each administering trust retained the tolls exacted as travellers passed its gates, but the tickets were also valid across the section operated by the other trust. As examples of revenue, the St Marylebone trust exacted £400 in 1757, which had risen to £700 in 1764. Five years later the road was extended at its eastern end south-eastwards to Old Street and onwards terminating near Moorgate.

Later history
The route became an important transport link. In due course it was improved and metalled. During the remainder of the 18th century the northern edge of London's built-up area moved towards the road, finally engulfing it, although the  building margin was enforced.

By 1829 much of the road was bordered by fashionable houses, and in that year that the first horse omnibus service in London was established by George Shillibeer. His example was followed by many others, and the route became the main artery for such traffic for the remainder of the century, linking the sought-after north-western suburbs of 'Tyburnia' with the financial centre (the City of London).

In 1857, New Road was renamed, becoming Marylebone Road, Euston Road and Pentonville Road.

In 1863, the Metropolitan Railway opened the first urban underground railway in the world. Most of the line followed the  route of the New Road from Paddington to Kings Cross stations.

In the 20th century, with the advent of motor buses and other motor vehicles, the route became an important orbital road for the northern part of inner London, and part of the inner ring road.

Currently the road as far as the Old Street Roundabout is the northern boundary of the London Congestion Charge area. Traffic can use the route free of charge, but a charge applies when accessing the roads to the south.

References and sources
References

Sources
Sheppard, Francis, Local government in St Marylebone 1688-1835 : University of London Athlone Press (1958)

 

Streets in the City of Westminster
Streets in the London Borough of Camden
Streets in the London Borough of Islington